Fracastorius is a genus of Asian seed bugs in the tribe Homoeocerini, erected by William Lucas Distant in 1901.  It contains the species Fracastorius cornutus Distant, 1902 originally recorded from Myanmar.

References

External links
 

Hemiptera genera
Hemiptera of Asia
Coreinae